AFL Northern Territory is the governing body for Australian rules football in the Northern Territory of Australia. It supervises multiple leagues, but is mainly concerned with the co-ordination of the Northern Territory Football League. The body is officially affiliated with the Australian Football League.

See also
Northern Territory Football League
Australian rules football in the Northern Territory
List of Australian rules football leagues in Australia

References

External links
 

1917 establishments in Australia
Sports organizations established in 1917
Australian rules football in the Northern Territory
Australian rules football governing bodies
Sports governing bodies in the Northern Territory